The list of Honorary Doctors of the University of Otago below shows the recipients of honorary doctorates bestowed by the University of Otago since 1962. Prior to this date honoris causa were conferred by the University of New Zealand; see the list of honorary doctors of the University of New Zealand.

References

Otago
Otago
Otago
New Zealand education-related lists
Lists of New Zealand people